The Anomini are a tribe of moths in the family Erebidae.

Genera
Alabama
Anomis
Dinumma

References

Scoliopteryginae
Moth tribes